Thomas J. Leonard (July 31, 1955 – February 11, 2003) was a major contributor to the development of personal coaching. He was an EST employee in the 1980s and founded Coach U, the International Coach Federation, Coachville, and the International Association of Coaching He participated in the foundation of the Coaches Training Institute deeply. He was the founder concerned with establishment of the other companies and organizations of coaching.

Notable contributions to coaching
Writing 6 coaching-related books, along with 14 internally published works available exclusively to the coaches at Coach University.
Founding the International Coach Federation in 1995.
Starting TeleClass.com in 1998. Teleclass.com is a virtual university with over 20,000 students, offering over 100 teleclasses during any given week, delivered via conference call and RealAudio.
Writing 28 personal and professional development programs which are used by coaches, training firms, and Fortune 100 companies.
Being featured on over 100 hours of commercially available audio-tape sets demonstrating techniques and processes of coaching.
Developing a popular website called TopTen.org, which contains over 1,000 (needs verification) Top 10 Lists on all subjects. (This is arguably one of the Internet's first article directories.
Founding Coach U, the oldest and largest professional coach training organization.
Founding and managing of CoachVille.com as CEO. Coachville is a network and trainer of coaches a majority in the U.S.
Founding the Graduate School of Coaching, a comprehensive coach training school (1000 courses in development), with 1400 students from 35 countries.
Founding the International Association of Coaching, a professional coaching association.
Publishing Today's Coach, a coaching industry ezine with over 30,000 subscribers.

Personal and professional development tools

Personal Foundation
Certified Strategist
Toleration-Free
Clean Sweep
SuperSensitive Person
A Perfect Life
Certified Critical Eye

Books

Working Wisdom
The Portable Coach, Scribner, August 1998, 
Becoming a Coach
Simply Brilliant, 
Coaching Forms Book
The Distinctionary
28 Laws of Attraction, Scribner, December 2007,

See also
Werner Erhard and Associates
Erhard Seminars Training
Landmark Worldwide

References

External links
Coachville
TopTen.org
CoachU
International Association of Coaching

1955 births
2003 deaths
Life coaches